Christophe Olol (born 30 August 1980) is a football goalkeeper from Guadeloupe.

He was part of the Guadeloupe national football team for the 2011 CONCACAF Gold Cup. Olol made his debut for Guadeloupe in a friendly against Guyana on 4 May 2012. He made his other appearance for Guadeloupe in a 2012 Caribbean Cup qualifier against Martinique on 27 October 2012.

References

External links
Goal.com

1980 births
Living people
Association football goalkeepers
Guadeloupean footballers
2011 CONCACAF Gold Cup players
Guadeloupe international footballers